Chandramauli Chopra (29 December 1917 – 12 December 2005) known professionally as Ramanand Sagar, was an Indian filmmaker, editor, playwright, poet and an author. He is best known for making the television show Ramayan (1987-1988). The Government of India honoured him with Padma Shri in 2000 for his contribution to Indian cinema and art.

Early life
Sagar was born at Asal Guru  near Lahore. His great-grandfather, Lala Shankar Das Chopra, migrated from Lahore to Kashmir. Ramanand was adopted by his maternal grandmother, who had no sons, at which point his name was changed from 'Chandramouli Chopra' to 'Ramanand Sagar'. After Sagar's biological mother died, his father remarried and had further children with her, including Vidhu Vinod Chopra, who is thus Sagar's half-brother. Sagar worked as a peon, truck cleaner, soap vendor, goldsmith apprentice etc. during the day and studied for his degree at night.
 
He was a gold medalist in Sanskrit and Persian from the University of Punjab in 1942. He was also editor of newspaper Daily Milap. He wrote many short stories, novels, poems, plays, etc. under names like "Ramanand Chopra", "Ramanand Bedi" and "Ramanand Kashmiri". In 1942 when he caught tuberculosis he wrote a subjective column, "Diary of a T.B. patient", about his fight. The column was published in series in the magazine Adab-e-Mashriq in Lahore.

Career

In 1932, Sagar started his film career as a clapper boy in a silent film, Raiders of the Rail Road. He then shifted to Bombay in 1949 after India's partition.

In the 1940s, Sagar started out as an assistant stage manager in Prithvi Theatres of Prithviraj Kapoor. He also directed a few plays under the fatherly guidance of Kapoor.

Along with other films that Sagar himself directed, he wrote the story and screenplay for Raj Kapoor's superhit Barsaat. He founded the film and television production company known as Sagar Films (Pvt. Ltd.) a.k.a. Sagar Arts in 1950. He produced and directed Bazooband and Mehmaan which were not successful.

He won the 1960 Filmfare Best Dialogue Award for Paigham which was directed by S. S. Vasan and starred Dilip Kumar, Vyjayanthimala and Raaj Kumar.

His successful directorial ventures included Ghunghat and Arzoo, which became blockbusters in the years 1960 and 1965 respectively. In 1964 he directed the classic Zindagi starring Rajendra Kumar, Vyjanthimala, Prithviraj Kapoor and Raaj Kumar. In 1968 he won the Filmfare Best Director Award for Ankhen. Ankhen was a spy-thriller starring Dharmendra and Mala Sinha. It was amongst the top 10 Hindi films of 1968. His films in the early 1970s were not successful like Geet and Laalkar. In 1976, he directed Charas starring Dharmendra and Hema Malini which was among the top five grossers of that year. In 1979, his directorial venture Prem Bandhan starring Rajesh Khanna, Rekha and Moushmi Chatterjee was successful commercially, becoming the sixth highest-grossing film of that year. In 1982, he directed Bhagavat starring Dharmendra, Hema Malini and Reena Roy which turned out to be a huge hit.

In 1985 he directed 'Salma' which was unsuccessful at the box office and though the music of the film romance was popular, the film did not perform well at box office.

In 1985 Sagar turned towards television with Dada Dadi Ki Kahaniyaan which was directed by Moti Sagar and produced by Ramanand Sagar. Then his Sagar Arts began producing serials based on Indian history. His directorial venture Ramayan aired its first episode on 25 January 1987. His next tele-serials were Krishna and Luv Kush which were both produced and directed by him. He also later directed Sai Baba. Sagar also made fantasy serials like Vikram Aur Betaal and Alif Laila.

The Ramayan series was initially conceptualized to run for 52 episodes of 45 minutes each. Owing to popular demand it had to be extended thrice, eventually ending after 78 episodes.

Sagar made a Luv Kush episode after receiving a call from PMO.

Based on his experiences of the Indo-Pak partition, Sagar published the Hindi-Urdu book Aur Insaan Mar Gaya in 1948.

The government of India honoured Sagar with the Padma Shri in 2000. Sagar died on 12 December 2005 aged 88 at his home in Mumbai after a series of health problems.

In December 2019, his son Prem Sagar launched a book on his life, An Epic Life: Ramanand Sagar, From Barsaat to Ramayan. This book is a biography of Ramanand Sagar depicting his life struggles and his journey from a clerk to one of the greatest filmmakers of all time.

Personal life
He was married to Leelavati, with whom he had five children, four sons (Anand Sagar, Prem Sagar, Moti Sagar and Subhash Sagar) and a daughter (Sarita Sagar).

Awards
In 2000, Sagar was honoured with Padma Shri by the Government of India.

Won
 1960 – Filmfare Best Dialogue Award for Paigham
 1969 – Filmfare Best Director Award for Aankhen

Nominated
 1966 – Filmfare Award for Best Story for Arzoo
 1966 – Filmfare Award for Best Director for Arzoo
 1969 – Filmfare Award for Best Story for Aankhen

Filmography

References

External links
 

1917 births
2005 deaths
20th-century Indian film directors
Hindi-language film directors
Filmfare Awards winners
Recipients of the Padma Shri in arts
Film directors from Mumbai
Film directors from Lahore